This is the discography of Cantopop artist Leo Ku.

Studio albums

Compilation albums

Live albums

Extended plays

VCD/DVD
August 2004: Music is Live (拉闊音樂會) (VCD/DVD)
June 2005: Leo Ku in Concert 2005 (05 勁歌金曲演唱會) (VCD)
July 2005: Leo Ku in Concert 2005 (05 勁歌金曲演唱會) (DVD)
January 2007: Joey Yung x Leo Ku - California Red 903 Concert Live Karaoke (容祖兒 x 古巨基 - 加州紅903黃金組合音樂會) (VCD/DVD)
February 2007: Leo Ku Karaoke (古巨基 - 黃金見聞錄卡拉OK) (VCD/DVD)
2007: Leo Ku The Magic Moments Concert 2007 (古巨基 The Magic Moments 演唱會 2007) (VCD/DVD)
2009: Leo Ku Eye Fever Concert 2009 (古巨基 Eye Fever 演唱會 2009) (DVD)

References 

Pop music discographies
Ku, Leo